María de los Ángeles Rozalén Ortuño (born 12 June 1986 in Albacete, Spain) known professionally as Rozalén is a Spanish singer and songwriter.

Life
She grew up in Letur.

She studied psychology at the University of Murcia with a master in music therapy.

She has collaborated with social organizations and NGO like Plan Internacional, AECC or Fundación Vicente Ferrer.

On 6 February 2021 she won the Goya Award for her song "Que no, que no".

Discography

Albums
 Con derecho a…, 2013
 Quién me ha visto... , 2015
 Cuando el río suena... , 2017
 El Árbol y el Bosque, 2020
 Matriz, 2022

Singles 
 80 veces, 2013
 Comiéndote a besos, 2013
 Saltan chispas, 2014
 Vuelves, 2015
 Ahora, 2015
 Será mejor, 2016
 Girasoles, 2017
 La puerta violeta, 2017
 Antes de verte, 2018
 Aves enjauladas, 2020
 Te Quiero Porque Te Quiero featuring Rodrigo Cuevas, 2022
 Amor del Bo featuring Silvia Pérez Cruz, 2022
 A Virxe Do Portovello featuring Tanxugueiras, 2022

Books
 Cerrando puntos suspensivos, 2018

References

External links
  www.rozalen.org

1986 births
Living people
Spanish women singer-songwriters
Spanish singer-songwriters
Spanish women guitarists
Singers from Castilla–La Mancha
Spanish activists
Spanish women activists
University of Murcia alumni
Writers from Castilla–La Mancha
21st-century Spanish women writers
21st-century Spanish singers
21st-century Spanish women singers
21st-century guitarists
Sony Music Spain artists
Spanish pop singers
Goya Award winners
Women in Latin music
Latin music songwriters
21st-century women guitarists